The Imperial Roman Catholic Theological Academy was an institution of higher education preparing Roman Catholic theologians in the Russian Empire. The academy granted master's and doctorate degrees in theology and was designed to prepare clergy for senior positions in the Catholic Church hierarchy. It originated at the Vilnius University, but was transferred to Saint Petersburg in the aftermath of the Uprising of 1831. The Tsarist authorities wanted to exercise greater control over the academy and implement Russification policies. After the October Revolution in 1917, the academy was moved to Poland where it became the Catholic University of Lublin. A new theological seminary was established in Moscow in 1993; it moved to the premises of the historical Saint Petersburg Academy in 1995.

In Vilnius
The academy traced its roots to the Supreme Theological Seminary of Vilnius University established in 1803–1808 in the Augustine monastery. After the Uprising of 1831, the university was closed leaving only two academies – the Academy of Medicine–Surgery and the Theological Academy. Both of them were subordinated to the Ministry of Internal Affairs (as opposed to Ministry of Education or Bishop of Vilnius). Vilnius Theological Academy was officially established on July 1, 1833. Courses included theology, scripture, homiletics, Biblical hermeneutics and archaeology, history of Christianity, canon law, logic, ethics, classical, Polish, and Russian languages and literature, world and Russian history. The lectures were held in Latin and Russian languages. The academy had about 40 students; the section devoted to the Armenian Catholic Church had 7 students. Its rectors were Alojzy Osiński (former lecturer at the Liceum Krzemienieckie; 1770–1842) and Antoni Fijałkowski (former professor at Vilnius University; 1797–1883). The academy had 8 faculty members, who included philologist Leon Borowski, philosopher Anioł Dowgird, historian Paweł Kukolnik. The academy closely cooperated with Vilnius Priest Seminary. Around 1840, the Tsarist authorities suspected that the students were planning another uprising. Therefore, the academy, including its students, professors, and library, was moved to Saint Petersburg in August 1842. The Academy of Medicine–Surgery was also closed, transferring its assets to the University of Kyiv. Vilnius and Lithuania were left without an institution of higher education.

In Saint Petersburg

In Saint Petersburg, the academy settled in the former palace of the Russian Academy on the Vasilyevsky Island in 1844. The purchase and reconstruction of the premises was financed with funds of closed Catholic monasteries. The consecration ceremony of the palace was attended by Emperor Nicholas I. On that occasion the academy was granted the title "Imperial Academy". All other Catholic academies became its subordinates. The number of students was limited to 40; the limit was increased to 60 after the Roman Catholic Clerical Academy in Warsaw was closed in 1867. From 1885 to 1917, the academy published students' research papers in a yearbook. Most gifted students were sent for further studies to western universities. In 1906, the academy had 13 faculty members. After the October Revolution in 1917, the academy was closed and moved to Poland where it became the Catholic University of Lublin.

People
The academy continued to prepare theologians for western provinces of the Russian Empire. The students were mostly Polish and Lithuanian, with some Belarusians, Latvians, Germans. In 70 years, the academy prepared more than 1,000 students. Its famous alumni and faculty included Fabijan Abrantovich, Antanas Baranauskas, Mgr. Konstanty Romuald Budkiewicz, Archbishop Jan Cieplak, Antoni Czerwiński, saint Zygmunt Szczęsny Feliński, Romuald Jałbrzykowski, Vladas Jurgutis, Aleksander Kakowski, Josef Alois Kessler, Mykolas Krupavičius, Zygmunt Łoziński, Maironis, blessed Jurgis Matulaitis-Matulevičius, Vincas Mykolaitis-Putinas, Justinas Pranaitis, Mečislovas Reinys, Franz Anton Schiefner, Juozapas Skvireckas, Boļeslavs Sloskāns, Julijans Vaivods, Motiejus Valančius.

Rectors
The academy rectors were:
 Ignacy Hołowiński (1842–1855)
 Wincenty Lipski (1855–1857)
 Antoni Jakubielski (1857–1860)
 Aleksander Kazimierz Bereśniewicz (1860–1864)
 Dominika Stacewicza (1864–1876)
 Szymon Marcin Kozłowski (1877–1880)
 Antoni Franciszek Audziewicz (1880–1884)
 Franciszek Albin Symon (1884–1897)
 Karol Niedziałkowski (1897–1901)
 Longin Żarnowiecki (1901–1910)
 Aleksander Kakowski (1910–1913)
 Idzi Benedykt Radziszewski (1914–1917)

References

External links
 Official website of the present-day Theological Seminary in Saint Petersburg

1833 establishments in the Russian Empire
1917 disestablishments in Russia
Universities and colleges in Saint Petersburg
Former Catholic universities and colleges
History of education in Lithuania
Defunct universities and colleges in Russia
Educational institutions established in 1833
Educational institutions disestablished in 1917